Fear of Death is a concept album from American comedian and musician Tim Heidecker, released on September25, 2020, through Spacebomb Records. It received positive reviews from critics.

Recording and release

Heidecker met Natalie Mering after she recorded an episode of his Office Hours podcast in January 2019 and the duo performed a cover of "Let It Be" for a charity event that June. Mering's bandmate Drew Erickson suggested that they go to the studio to record new material together. Heidecker composed most songs solo, with Mering adding to two tracks; the lyrical themes of death, regret, and existential reflection were not deliberate but Heidecker realized these came out of his own personal anxieties in middle age. Heidecker announced the album on August5, 2020, and released a music video of an in-studio performance of the title track.

Audio of "Nothing" was released on August26, followed by "Property" on September16. Heidecker previewed "Oh How We Drift Away" on September22 and announced several online promotional events: a Reddit AMA, an episode of his Office Hours podcast devoted to the album, and a virtual car ride via the Drive & Listen website that previewed the release three days early. The music video for "Property" was released on October8.

Critical reception
Album of the Year sums up critical consensus as a 79 out of 100 with two reviews. Once "Nothing" was previewed, the magazine named it another one of the best songs of that week as well. Writing for Exclaim!, Vish Khanna gave the album a nine out of 10, praising his songwriting by comparing it to Elton John, John Lennon, and Paul Simon's, considering it "strikingly timeless and authentic rock music, helmed by an underground Renaissance man". 

In Paste, Max Freedman rated the album a 6.7 out of 10, noting solid songwriting and musicianship but criticizing the mixture of comedy and seriousness: "While this sentiment bears the album’s full thematic gravity, there’s something undeniably comical about how much heart the two put into this almost hokey bout of existentialism against the song’s simultaneously somber and jovial music." 

In The Observer, Ryan Israel compares the album favorably to Big Star and Carole King, giving it four out of five stars. Under the Radar considered the song "Fear of Death" one of its 10 best songs of the week, with reviewer Samantha Small praising the musicianship. The publication's review of the album by Caleb Campbell rated it eight out of 10, praising Heidecker for successfully drawing on his inspiration of 1970s pop rock and not being too weighed down by his other career in comedy. Paste included this in their five best rock albums of September 2020, with reviewer Max Freedman praising it for being timely and mixing comedy with solid songwriting.

Track listing
All songs composed by Tim Heidecker, except where noted.

"Prelude to Feelings"– 1:22
"Come Away with Me"– 3:07
"Backwards"– 3:50
"Fear of Death"– 4:00
"Someone Who Can Handle You"– 3:42
"Nothing" (Tim Heidecker and Natalie Mering)– 2:59
"Say Yes"– 5:26
"Property"– 3:31
"Little Lamb"– 2:29
"Let It Be" (Lennon–McCartney)– 2:30
"Long as I’ve Got You"– 2:18
"Oh How We Drift Away" (Heidecker and Mering)– 5:34

Personnel

Tim Heidecker– guitar, vocals, production

Additional musicians
Josh Adams– drums, percussion
Eliana Athayde– bass guitar
Stephanie Barrett– cello
Johanna Beaver– viola
Mike Bloom– guitar
Naima Burrs– violin
Brian D'Addario– bass guitar, electric and acoustic guitar, vocals, mellotron
Michael D'Addario– drums, electric guitar, vocals
Zach Dawes– bass guitar
Drew Erickson– piano, organ, drums, celeste, Wurlitzer, mellotron, string synthesizer, production
Connor ‘Catfish’ Gallaher– pedal steel guitar
Treesa Gold– violin
Peter Greydanus– cello
Alison Hall– violin
Jeannette Jang– violin
Jordan Katz– horns
Benji Lysaght– electric guitar
Stacy Matthews– violin
Natalie Mering– piano, backing vocals, production, lead vocals on "Oh How We Drift Away"
Stella Mozgawa– drums, percussion
Adrian Pintea– violin
Trey Pollard– string arrangements
Jonathan Rado– bass guitar, acoustic guitar, mellotron, piano, percussion, EMS Synthi, additional production
David Ralicke– horns
Ellen Riccio– violin
Meredith Riley– violin
Kim Ryan– viola
Molly Sharp– viola
Schuyler Slack– cello

Technical personnel
Robert Beatty– artwork
Sean Cook– engineering, mixing
Alex De Jong– string recording at Spacebomb Studios in Richmond, Virginia
Kenny Gilmore– engineering, mixing
Michael Harris– engineering
Travis Pavur– additional engineering
Travis Robertson– design
Sarah Tudzin– engineering

See also
List of 2020 albums

References

External links

Interview and live set by Heidecker and Weyes Blood for NPR's World Cafe
Reddit AMA

2020 albums
Concept albums
Spacebomb Records albums
Tim Heidecker albums
Works about death
Albums with cover art by Robert Beatty (artist)
Albums produced by Tim Heidecker
Albums produced by Weyes Blood
Albums recorded at Electro-Vox Recording Studios